Marion Sims Wyeth   (February 17, 1889 – February 4, 1982) was an American architect known for his range in styles such as Art Deco, Mediterranean Revival, and classical Georgian, French, and Colonial. He designed numerous mansions in Palm Beach, Florida during its gilded age.  Wyeth was among a group of architects considered the “Big Five,” along with John L. Volk, Addison Mizner, Maurice Fatio, and Howard Major, who defined Palm Beach style in the early twentieth century.

Biography 
Wyeth was born in New York City to Florence Nightingale Sims and Dr. John Allan Wyeth, who founded what is today the Stuyvesant Polyclinic Hospital in 1882 (which became Cabrini Medical Center).  His grandfather J. Marion Sims founded the first Women's Hospital in the U.S. in 1855 (it is now part of Mount Sinai Morningside).Wyeth attended Princeton University and studied at the École nationale supérieure des Beaux-Arts in Paris, where he was awarded the Prix Jean LeClerc in 1913 and the Deuxième Prix Rougevin in 1914.

Wyeth worked at Carrère & Hastings. He moved to Palm Beach, Florida in 1919 where he founded the firm of Wyeth and King with his business partner Frederic Rhinelander King. He was the first Palm Beach architect to be elected a fellow of the American Institute of Architects.

Wyeth had over 700 commissions, many of which in Palm Beach, including Mar-a-Lago (1923-1927 with Joseph Urban). Other notable commissions include the Norton Museum of Art (1941) in West Palm Beach, the Florida Governors Mansion in Tallahassee, and Shangri La, Doris Duke’s house in Honolulu, Hawaii.

In 1993, Wyeth's collection was donated to the Preservation Foundation of Palm Beach by architect Sidney Neil. The collection includes 13,000 architectural drawings and over 900 photographs.

Projects

Mar-a-Lago, Palm Beach, Florida
La Claridad, Palm Beach, Florida
Norton Museum of Art, West Palm Beach, Florida
High Point Monument, New Jersey and associated Grey Rock Inn
Florida Governor's Mansion, Tallahassee, Florida 
Shangri La, Doris Duke's home in Honolulu
The Church of the Epiphany on New York City's Upper East Side
Dutch South African Village, Coral Gables, Florida

References

External links
Marion Sims Wyeth Collection on Omeka 

1889 births
1982 deaths
Architects from New York City
Architects from Florida
 American neoclassical architects
American residential architects
People from Palm Beach, Florida
Princeton University alumni
American alumni of the École des Beaux-Arts
Fellows of the American Institute of Architects